Pleistodontes nitens is a species of fig wasp which is native to Australia.  It has an obligate mutualism with Ficus crassipes, the fig species it pollinates.

References 

Agaonidae
Hymenoptera of Australia
Insects described in 1915
Taxa named by Alexandre Arsène Girault